Humoral immune deficiencies are conditions which cause impairment of humoral immunity, which can lead to immunodeficiency. It can be mediated by insufficient number or function of B cells, the plasma cells they differentiate into, or the antibody secreted by the plasma cells. The most common such immunodeficiency is inherited selective IgA deficiency, occurring between 1 in 100 and 1 in 1000 persons, depending on population. They are associated with increased vulnerability to infection, but can be difficult to detect (or asymptomatic) in the absence of infection.

Signs and symptoms
Signs/symptoms of humoral immune deficiency depend on the cause, but generally include signs of infection such as:
 Sinusitis
 Sepsis
 Skin infection
 Pneumonia

Causes
Cause of this deficiency is divided into primary and secondary:
 Primary the International Union of Immunological Societies classifies primary immune deficiencies of the humoral system as follows:

 Absent B cells with a resultant severe reduction of all types of antibody: X-linked agammaglobulinemia (btk deficiency, or Bruton's agammaglobulinemia), μ-Heavy chain deficiency, l 5 deficiency, Igα deficiency, BLNK deficiency, thymoma with immunodeficiency
 B cells low but present, but with reduction in 2 or more isotypes (usually IgG & IgA, sometimes IgM): common variable immunodeficiency (CVID), ICOS deficiency, CD19 deficiency, TACI (TNFRSF13B) deficiency, BAFF receptor deficiency.
 Normal numbers of B cells with decreased IgG and IgA and increased IgM: Hyper-IgM syndromes
 Normal numbers of B cells with isotype or light chain deficiencies: heavy chain deletions, kappa chain deficiency, isolated IgG subclass deficiency, IgA with IgG subsclass deficiency, selective immunoglobulin A deficiency
 Transient hypogammaglobulinemia of infancy (THI)
 Secondary secondary (or acquired) forms of humoral immune deficiency are mainly due to hematopoietic malignancies and infections that disrupt the immune system:
Multiple myeloma
Chronic lymphoid leukemia
AIDS

Diagnosis

In terms of diagnosis of humoral immune deficiency depends upon the following:
 Measure serum immunoglobulin levels
 B cell count
 Family medical history

Treatment

Treatment for B cell deficiency (humoral immune deficiency) depends on the cause, however generally the following applies:
 Treatment of infection (antibiotics)
 Surveillance for malignancies
 Immunoglobulin replacement therapy

See also
 Immunodeficiency
 T cell deficiency

References

Further reading

External links 
 PubMed

Predominantly antibody deficiencies